Strangways is a large impact structure, the eroded remnant of a former impact crater, located in the Northern Territory of Australia about  east-south-east of the town of Mataranka. It was named after the nearby Strangways River. The location is remote and difficult to access.  Its age has been determined as approximately 646 Ma.

Description 
The circular topographic feature that marks the site was originally thought to be volcanic, with an impact origin first proposed in 1971 after the discovery of evidence diagnostic of impact including shatter cones and shocked quartz. However, this is only a relic of the original crater after considerable erosion. The age of the impact event has been determined at 646 ± 42 Ma (Neoproterozoic) based on radiometric dating of impact melt rocks.

In 1996, the crater's site was listed on the now-defunct Register of the National Estate.

See also

List of impact craters in Australia

References 

Impact craters of the Northern Territory
Proterozoic impact craters
Precambrian Australia
Geology of the Northern Territory
Northern Territory places listed on the defunct Register of the National Estate